Rajinder Singh "Raj" Pannu (born January 12, 1934) is a Canadian educator and politician, who led the Alberta New Democratic Party from 2000 to 2004.

Pannu was born in Punjab, India completing an undergraduate degree before immigrating to Canada in 1962. He settled in Whitecourt, Alberta, where he worked as a high school teacher until 1964.

In 1964 he moved to Edmonton to work on a graduate program, completing a Ph.D. in sociology in 1973. He taught at York University for one year (1968–69) before returning to the University of Alberta, where he taught for 27 years until his retirement in 1996. He is Professor Emeritus at the University of Alberta.

He entered provincial politics in 1997 when he was first elected to the Legislative Assembly of Alberta representing the riding of Edmonton-Strathcona. Pannu became leader in February 2000 after the previous leader, Pam Barrett, retired from politics.

Pannu ran a high-profile campaign in the 2001 Alberta election. T-shirts emblazoned with the slogan "Raj Against the Machine", as well as a reputation as a "likeable and honest politician" contributed to his popularity and made him a leader well respected by supporters and non-supporters alike.

He announced on July 13, 2004 that he was resigning as party leader. Fellow MLA Brian Mason, the deputy leader, became interim leader. Mason was formally elected leader in a leadership convention held on September 18. However, he sought re-election as an MLA in the 26th Alberta general election, and was re-elected by a wide margin.

On June 14, 2006, he announced his retirement from Alberta politics at the dissolution of the legislature, which took place in February 2008.

References

External links
 All The Raj, SEE Magazine

1934 births
Living people
Alberta CCF/NDP leaders
Alberta New Democratic Party MLAs
Indian emigrants to Canada
Canadian politicians of Indian descent
People from Whitecourt
Politicians from Edmonton
21st-century Canadian politicians